Phillip Benjamin Baldwin (December 23, 1924 – April 20, 2002) was a United States circuit judge of the United States Court of Appeals for the Federal Circuit and previously was an Associate Judge of the United States Court of Customs and Patent Appeals.

Education and career

Baldwin was born in Marshall, Texas, the son of Lucile Jones Baldwin and John Browning Baldwin, M.D., and brother of John Browning "Jack" Baldwin, Jr., Mary Jane Baldwin Sanders and Francis Scott "Scotty" Baldwin, Sr. He was the grandson of J.B. Baldwin, after whom the settlement of Baldwin, Texas was named. Baldwin was a United States Army Air Corps pilot from 1943 to 1946, flying B-25 Mitchells in the South West Pacific theatre of World War II on low-level bombing raids. His unit was the 405th Flight Squadron, 38th Bombardment Group, of the Fifth Air Force. He earned the Asiatic-Pacific Campaign Medal with six bronze service stars (Luzon, Western Pacific, New Guinea, Borneo, China Sea offensive, and the air offensive of Japan). He was also decorated with the American Campaign Medal and by the Philippine Government with the Philippine Liberation Medal. Baldwin later went on to pursue his undergraduate degree at North Texas State University, receiving a Bachelor of Arts degree in 1949. He studied at Baylor Law School before graduating from the South Texas College of Law. He went into private practice in his hometown of Marshall and then moved on to public service a year later, serving as Assistant District Attorney for Harrison County, Texas and later District Attorney. In 1959, he returned to private practice in Marshall with his brother, Scotty Baldwin, and remained there until his appointment to the federal bench in 1968.

Federal judicial service

Baldwin was nominated by President Lyndon B. Johnson on May 29, 1968, to a seat on the United States Court of Customs and Patent Appeals vacated by Judge Isaac Jack Martin. He was confirmed by the United States Senate on July 25, 1968, and received his commission on July 25, 1968. He was reassigned by operation of law on October 1, 1982, to the United States Court of Appeals for the Federal Circuit, to a new seat authorized by 96 Stat. 25. He assumed senior status due to a certified disability on November 24, 1986. His service terminated on April 8, 1991, due to his retirement. He died in Shreveport, Louisiana on April 20, 2002.

Notable case

Baldwin was the author of In re Moore (444 F. 2d 572, 170 U.S.P.Q. (BNA) 260 (Fed. Cir. 1987)), a patent law case establishing the logical asymmetry of the "prior invention" standard between patent interference claims and Rule 131 affidavits.

Personal life

Baldwin was married to Mertie Bellamy Baldwin for 54 years. He had four children, Rebecca Baldwin Clark, Jane Baldwin Chrisenberry, Phillip Baldwin, Jr., and Nancy Baldwin Rohtert.

References

External links
 

1924 births
2002 deaths
Baylor Law School alumni
Judges of the United States Court of Appeals for the Federal Circuit
Judges of the United States Court of Customs and Patent Appeals
People from Marshall, Texas
South Texas College of Law alumni
United States Army Air Forces officers
United States Army Air Forces pilots of World War II
United States federal judges appointed by Lyndon B. Johnson
20th-century American judges
University of North Texas alumni